Parastoo Golestani (born 1971) is an Iranian actress.

Biography 
Parastoo Golestani was born 1971 in Tehran. She is niece of Mehdi Akhavan-Sales, an Iranian poet. She is divorced from Behrooz Baghaei.

She attended Islamic Azad University where she received a bachelor's degree in acting and directing.

Golestani won the best actress award at the 17th Fajr International Film Festival in 1999.

Filmography
 Pedar Salar
 Dani and I
 A Day and An Eagle
 Man of Many Faces (TV series)

References

External links 

Parastoo Golestani at IranActor Site

Living people
1971 births
People from Tehran
Actresses from Tehran
Iranian film actresses
Iranian stage actresses
Iranian television actresses
Islamic Azad University alumni
20th-century Iranian actresses
21st-century Iranian actresses